Lamprey is a surname. Notable people with the surname include:

Zane Lamprey (born 1976), American comedian, actor, editor, producer, and writer
Hugh Lamprey (1928–1996), British ecologist and bush pilot
Teresa Lamprey, one of the directors of Brazilian soap opera Viver a Vida